Time in Fiji is given by Fiji Time (FJT) (UTC+12:00), as standard time, and UTC+13:00 as daylight saving time, which it observes every second Sunday in November. to the second Sunday in January

IANA time zone database
The IANA time zone database in the file zone.tab contains one time zone for Fiji, named "Pacific/Fiji".

See also
Daylight saving time in Fiji
Time zone

References